Shantnu & Nikhil is an Indian Couture label founded by brothers Shantanu Mehra and Nikhil Mehra in 2000. Aditya Birla Fashion and Retail Limited (ABFRL) acquired 51 percent stakes in the company Finesse International Design Private Limited which is run by the label in a 60 crore deal.

Notable Clients 

Ranveer Singh
Hrithik Roshan
Kiara Advani
Shahid Kapoor
Shilpa Shetty

References 

Fashion labels from India
Indian male fashion designers